Quatre is one of the Grenadines islands which lie between the Caribbean islands of Saint Vincent and Grenada. It is part of the nation of Saint Vincent and the Grenadines.

Geography 
Quatre island lies southwest of Pigeon Island and south of the larger island Bequia and north of Canouan. About 8 km away, to the southeast is popular with tourists island Mustique. It has an area of 1.52 km² and a length of 3 km and a width of 250 to 950 m. The highest point reaches 146 m above sea level, and the average height is 38 meters.

History 
Until the end of Seven Years' War  Quatre island was France colony along with the other islands of this region. In 1763 they all were ceded to England. For more than a hundred years, the island has been owned by the Mitchell family, former captains who will continue to keep a part of the island for themselves after sale of big part of island for resort development.

The island was formerly home to white cedar (Tabebuia heterophylla), which was used for shipbuilding.

References

Islands of Saint Vincent and the Grenadines
Windward Islands
Private islands of Saint Vincent and the Grenadines